Șicula is a commune in Arad County, Romania. It is composed of three villages: Chereluș (Kerülős), Gurba (Garba) and Șicula.

The Crișul Alb Valley is well-known for its rich flora and fauna.

Demographics
According to the 2011 census, the commune has 4,301 inhabitants, out of which 95.79% are Romanians and 1.35% are Roma.

History
The first documentary records of Șicula and Chereluș date back to 1334, while Gurba was first mentioned in 1213.

Natives
Avram Bunaciu
Ioan Flueraș

References

Communes in Arad County
Localities in Crișana